Maiden Castle is an Iron Age hill fort, one of many fortified hill-top settlements constructed across Britain during the Iron Age, but one of only seven in the county of Cheshire in northern England. The hill fort was probably occupied from its construction in 600 BC until the Roman conquest of Britain in the 1st century AD. At this time the Cornovii tribe are recorded to have occupied parts of the surrounding area but, because they left no distinctive pottery or metalworking, their occupation has not been verified. Since then it has been quarried and used for military exercises. It is protected as a Scheduled Ancient Monument, and is owned by the National Trust. The hill fort is open to visitors, but unrestricted access to the site has resulted in it being classified as "at high risk" from erosion.

Location

Although there are over 1,300 hill forts in England, they are concentrated in the south of the country, with only seven in Cheshire.

Maiden Castle sits on a slight promontory which is the highest point of a plateau on Bickerton Hill, . The ground to the west and north of the hill fort is steeply sloping, making artificial defences unnecessary and providing a commanding view of the Cheshire Plain.

Layout
There is no evidence that Maiden Castle was protected by a ditch along with the banks. The main entrance is on the east side of the fort where the inner bank turns in towards the fort, and while there is a gap in the outer rampart it does not turn in. There may also be two other entrances to the site where the banks meet the cliffs to the north and south; the outer ditch runs inwards at both ends, possibly indicating an in-turned entrance abutting the edge of the cliff – similar to the entrance at the Helsby hill fort also in Cheshire – or perhaps an attempt to make the banks run flush to the cliff-edge to ensure there were no gaps in the site's defences.

History

Radiocarbon dating indicates that the ramparts defending Maiden Castle were built in around 600 BC. It was built from sand and had a dry stone facing at the front and no revetment behind. The defences cover about  out of the entire  of the Maiden Castle site. According to archaeologist James Forde-Johnston, who conducted a study of the hill forts of Lancashire and Cheshire in 1962, this was an unusually strong defence for such a small site. Few artefacts have been recovered from the site; they include a piece of Iron Age pottery. Maiden Castle was probably occupied until the Roman conquest of Britain in 1st century AD, and the outer bank may have been reconstructed around this time.

The name Maiden Castle is not unique to the site and occurs in several other places in Britain, such as Maiden Castle in Dorset, and probably means a "fortification that looks impregnable" or one that has never been taken in battle. Despite quarrying in the 17th century and 20th-century military exercises on the site, Maiden Castle survives well. Maiden Castle was excavated between 1932 and 1935 by W. J. Varley, who also undertook excavations at Eddisbury hill fort, as part of his investigation into the origin of Cheshire's hill forts. Further excavations were undertaken in 1980–1981. The structure was made a Scheduled Ancient Monument in 1995, giving Maiden Castle protection against unauthorised change. The environment of the hill fort is a mixture of heathland, heather, and bracken. The site is owned by the National Trust and is open to the public. Unrestricted access has led to problems such as erosion. Maiden Castle has been damaged by animal burrows and is designated as "at high risk" due to erosion caused by visitors and the spread of bracken. Five of Cheshire's seven hill forts have been assessed as being "at high risk" compared to 15% of North West England's Scheduled Monuments.

See also

Hillforts in Britain
List of hill forts in England
Scheduled Monuments in Cheshire (pre-1066)

References

Bibliography

Further reading

Hill forts in Cheshire
Scheduled monuments in Cheshire
National Trust properties in Cheshire